Arthur Bowie Chrisman (July 16, 1889 – February 14, 1953) was an American author. He was born in Clarke County, Virginia. Chrisman was educated in a one-room school and attended Virginia Polytechnic Institute from 1906 to 1908 but left at the end of his sophomore year. His collection of sixteen short stories, Shen of the Sea: A Book for Children (1925), received the Newbery Medal in 1926. Chrisman's other works included The Wind That Wouldn't Blow: Stories of the Merry Middle Kingdom for Children, and Myself (1927), Clarke County, 1836–1936 (1936), and Treasures Long Hidden: Old Tales and New Tales of the East (1941).

Chrisman suffered from respiratory problems and moved to Arkansas in about 1943. In his later years he became reclusive and seldom left his one-room cabin in Shirley, Arkansas. Two local men discovered his body on February 21, 1953, after Chrisman missed one of his regular grocery-buying trips into Clinton. The Van Buren County coroner estimated that he had been dead for about a week.

References
Autobiography in Kunitz, Stanley J., and Howard Haycraft, eds. The Junior Book of Authors. (1934), pages 87–89.
Miller, Bertha Mahony, and Elinor Whitney Field, eds. Newbery Medal Books: 1922-1955. (1955), pages 39–43.
Obituary in Clinton, Ark., Van Buren County Democrat, February 27, 1953.

External links 
 
 
 

1889 births
1953 deaths
American children's writers
American male short story writers
American short story writers
Newbery Medal winners
People from Clarke County, Virginia
People from Van Buren County, Arkansas
Virginia Tech alumni
Writers from Virginia
20th-century American male writers